The Qingyunge Art (QYG Art) is a cultural center in Wanhua District, Taipei, Taiwan.

Name
The name Qingyue has a literal meaning of blue clouds chamber.

History
Before 2014, the building was severely damaged. Starting 2014, the building was restored at a cost of NT$30 million and transformed it into a cultural center.

Architecture
The building is a three-story structure. It features a logo designed by calligrapher Tong Yang-tze (董陽孜).

References

External links
 

Cultural centers in Taipei